Sant'Agostino is a church in the historical center of Genoa, northern Italy. It is today deconsecrated, sometimes used for representations of the nearby Teatro della Tosse.

History
Begun by the Augustinians in 1260, it is one of the few Gothic buildings remaining in the city, after the numerous demolitions in the 19th century.  It has a typical façade with bichrome stripes in white marble and blue stone, with a large rose window in the middle. Notable is the ogival portal with, in the lunette, a fresco depicting St Augustine by Giovanni Battista Merano. At the sides are two double mullioned windows.

The interior has a nave and two aisles divided by ogival arches supported by robust columns with cubic capitals. The church has also two cloister now included into a museum.

References

Churches completed in 1260
13th-century Roman Catholic church buildings in Italy
Agostino
Gothic architecture in Liguria